Wakyaato is a town in Nakaseke District, Central Uganda. The correct spelling of the town is with two "a"s after the "y". However, some sources have the wrong spelling with one "a".

Location
The coordinates of Wakyaato are:00 52 41N, 32 12 18E (Latitude:0.8790;Longitude:32.2000).

Overview
Wakyaato is a small town in northern Nakaseke District. It is the headquarters of Wakyaato Sub-county, one of the eight (8) Sub-counties that constitute the district. The northern part of the district is inhabited predominantly by pastoralist communities, contrasting with the subsistence agriculturalists who inhabit the southern part of Nakaseke District.

Population
The exact population of Wakyaato is not known, as of January 2010.

Landmarks
The landmarks within the town or close to its borders include:

 The offices of Wakyaato Town Council
 The headquarters of Wakyaato Sub-county
 Wakyaato Central Market is the main market
 Wakyaato Health Center III - A health facility administered by the Uganda Ministry of Health
 Wakyaato Prison - A correctional facility administered by the Uganda Prisons Department

External links
 Nakaseke District Profile
 Location of Wakyaato At Google Maps

See also
 Nakaseke District
 Luweero Triangle
 Central Region, Uganda

References

Populated places in Central Region, Uganda
Cities in the Great Rift Valley
Nakaseke District